Megacelaenopsidae is a family of mites in the order Mesostigmata.

Species
Megacelaenopsidae contains two genera, with two recognized species:

 Genus Megacelaenopsis Funk, 1975
 Megacelaenopsis oudemansi Funk, 1975
 Genus Pelorocelaenopsis Funk, 1975
 Pelorocelaenopsis camini Funk, 1975

References

Mesostigmata
Acari families